Women's Hockey League may refer to:

Ice hockey

Top-level leagues 
 Australian Women's Ice Hockey League (AWIHL), founded in 2005
 Bulgarian Women's Hockey League
 European Women's Hockey League (EWHL), formerly called Elite Women's Hockey League, founded 2004
German Women's Ice Hockey League (DFEL)
 Icelandic Women's Hockey League
 Italian Hockey League Women
 National Women's Hockey League (NWHL), now renamed to Premier Hockey Federation (PHF), a North American league founded in 2015
National Women's Ice Hockey League (LNHHF)
 Swedish Women's Hockey League (SDHL)
 Turkish Women's Ice Hockey League
 Women's Hockey League (WHL, founded 2015), official name of the Zhenskaya Hockey League, a professional ice hockey league in Eurasia
 Women's Japan Ice Hockey League (WJIHL), founded in 2012

Other leagues 
 Eastern Collegiate Women's Hockey League (ECWHL), an American league founded in 2003
 Junior Women's Hockey League (JWHL), a North American junior league founded in 2007
 Mid-Atlantic Women's Hockey League (MAWHL), an American senior amateur league founded in 1975
 Provincial Women's Hockey League (PWHL), a junior league in Ontario founded in 2004
 Western Women's Collegiate Hockey League (WWCHL), an American league founded in 2014

Defunct leagues 
 Canadian Women's Hockey League (CWHL), a senior league which was active 2007–2019
 Central Ontario Women's Hockey League (COWHL), a senior league which was active 1992–1998
 National Women's Hockey League (NWHL), a North American league which was active 1999–2007
 Russian Women's Hockey League (RWHL, 1995–2015), predecessor of the Women's Hockey League ( Zhenskaya Hockey League)
 Western Women's Hockey League (WWHL), a Canadian league which was active 2004–2011

Field hockey 
 Women's Australian Hockey League
 Women's Belgian Hockey League
 Women's England Hockey League
 Women's Euro Hockey League
 Women's Irish Hockey League

See also